Leoville (sometimes known collectively as Harper Road) is a Canadian rural community located on Route 158, 3.50–5.00 miles SW of Tignish in western Prince County, Prince Edward Island.

Adjacent to Harper and southwest of the village of Tignish, the community is named after Pope Leo XIII.  It was created on December 3, 1946, as a means of separating the northern and southern end of Harper Road into different school districts.

See also
Tignish
Harper
Route 158
Route 159
Route 160
St. Simon & St. Jude Church (Tignish)
Palmer Road

Communities in Prince County, Prince Edward Island